Louis de Bouillé (Martinique, 1 May 1769 – 20 November 1850) was a French general. He was the son and brother of the two Bouillés who participated in Louis XVI's attempted Flight to Varennes.

References

Further reading 

 

1769 births
1850 deaths
French generals